There will be 230 lunar eclipses in the 21st century (2001–2100): 87 penumbral, 58 partial and 85 total.

Eclipses are listed in sets by lunar years, repeating every 12 months for each node. Ascending node eclipses are given a red background highlight.

See also: List of lunar eclipses, List of 20th-century lunar eclipses, and List of 22nd-century lunar eclipses

List of lunar eclipses between 1998 and 2100 

Eclipses from August 1998 are included to complete the first eclipse set.

References
This list was compiled with data calculated by Fred Espenak of NASA's GSFC.

Lunar eclipses
Lunar eclipses
21
Science timelines
Lunar eclipses by time